Frank Baum (born 30 January 1956) is a retired German footballer, who played as a defender for several German football clubs and the East Germany national football team between 1963 and 1997.

Baum spent his youth playing for BSG Aktivist Zwenkau and 1. FC Lokomotive Leipzig. Between 1974 and 1979 Baum played for BSG Chemie Leipzig and by the 1978–79 season was a regular first-team player. On 28 February 1979 he gained his first cap for East Germany in a 1–0 loss to Bulgaria. The same year saw Baum transfer to city rivals Lokomotiv Leipzig, where he played for the next ten years. Following the transfer, he won the FDGB Pokal three times and played the European Cup. He was part of the team who reached the final of the 1986–87 UEFA Cup Winners' Cup in Athens, losing 1–0 to AFC Ajax.

In total, Baum played in 248 games in the DDR-Oberliga, scoring ten goals.

Between 1979 and 1984 he made 17 appearances for East Germany. He won a silver medal in the 1980 Olympics in Moscow with the GDR Olympic team.

After leaving Lokomotive Leipzig in 1989, Baum had spells at Chemie Böhlen, Sachsen Leipzig and VfB Zwenkau.

Baum became first-team player-coach at SV LVB Leipzig and also coached Kickers 94 Markkleeberg in 1995. Currently, he is coaching the men's first team of the Leipzig Transport Authority team in the Leipzig District League.

Honours

 FDGB Pokal champion: 1981, 1986, 1987 (1. FC Lokomotive Leipzig)
 UEFA Cup Winners' Cup runners-up: 1987 (1. FC Lokomotive Leipzig)
 Olympic silver medal: 1980 (East Germany)

External links

References

1956 births
Living people
People from Zwenkau
People from Bezirk Leipzig
East German footballers
Footballers from Saxony
Association football defenders
East Germany international footballers
1. FC Lokomotive Leipzig players
FSV Zwickau players
FC Sachsen Leipzig players
Olympic footballers of East Germany
Footballers at the 1980 Summer Olympics
Olympic silver medalists for East Germany
Olympic medalists in football
Medalists at the 1980 Summer Olympics
Recipients of the Patriotic Order of Merit in bronze
German footballers
DDR-Oberliga players